Clean Energy Collective (CEC) is an American clean energy company that is based in Louisville, Colorado.

History 
Founded in 2010, the Clean Energy Collective builds, operates, and maintains community-based clean energy facilities. 

The CEC provides its cooperatives with Community Solar Platform (CSP) software that calculates production and monthly credits for participants. This product includes a smartphone app.

Community Solar Plan 
Under the CEC community solar plan, an individual or entity can buy solar panels, without them needing to be physically attached to the purchaser's property. Solar panel owners are paid in electricity credits for the value of the electricity generated. Under this agreement, maintenance is included, so the CEC (not the individual) is responsible for the repair, cleaning, or replacement of the panels.

Funding 

In 2012, Sooper Credit Union of Arvada, Colorado, agreed to offer long-term loans to consumers and businesses that buy into CEC community-owned solar gardens.  

Con Edison CEB, the "second largest developer/owner/operator of solar facilities in the United States" formed in 2016 and a wholly-owned subsidiary of Consolidated Edison, Inc. (ED), "purchased a portfolio of Community Solar projects in development from Clean Energy Collective, LLC" in 2020.

Partnership 

The Clean Energy Collective has partnered with local utilities, including: Holy Cross Energy, Poudre Valley Rural Electric Association (PVREA), and the Wright-Hennepin Cooperative Electric Association

In 2014, solar manufacturer First Solar took a minority equity position in Clean Energy Collective. It announced a "strategic partnership to develop and market" community solar gardens for utilities.

Bankruptcy 

In 2020, Clean Energy Collective filed for bankruptcy.

See also 

 Community solar farm
 American Solar Energy Society
 List of photovoltaics companies
 National Renewable Energy Laboratory
 Renewable energy in the United States
 Solar Energy Industries Association
 Venture capital

References

External links

American companies established in 2010
Energy companies established in 2010
Renewable resource companies established in 2010
Solar energy companies of the United States
2010 establishments in Colorado
Companies based in Boulder County, Colorado
Companies that filed for Chapter 11 bankruptcy in 2020